The 1970 Sandown Three Hour 250 was an Australian endurance motor race for Series Production Cars. The event was held on 13 September 1970 over 130 laps of the 1.9 mile Sandown Park circuit in Victoria, Australia, a total of 247 miles. There were 42 starters in the event.

Canadian race driver Allan Moffat won the first of his five Sandown endurance race victories. Moffat drove the factory-prepared Ford Falcon GT-HO race car to a one lap victory over Holden Dealer Team driver, Colin Bond (Holden Torana). Chrysler factory team driver Norm Beechey (Chrysler Valiant Pacer) finished in third position, three laps behind Bond.

This event, revived from a previous six-hour format, debuted in 1968 and quickly became the recognized precursor event to the annual Bathurst 500 / 1000 race.

Results 

 Note : Of the 42 starters in the event, one has not been accounted for in the above table.

References

Further reading 

 Australian Motor Manual, November 1970, pages 58–59
 Holden, The official racing history, 1988, page 332
 Modern Motor, November 1970, page 100
 Racing Car News, October 1970, pages 59–61
 The Australian Racing History of Ford, 1989, page 285
 The Melbourne Age, 14 September 1970
 The Melbourne Age, 9 September 1970, page 36

External links 
 1970 Australian motor sport images including 1970 Sandown Three Hour 250

Motorsport at Sandown
Sandown Three Hour 250
Pre-Bathurst 500
September 1970 sports events in Australia